The 2011 FIA WTCC Race of Belgium (formally the 2011 FIA WTCC Monroe Race of Belgium) was the second round of the 2011 World Touring Car Championship season. It was held at Circuit Zolder on 24 April 2011 and was the third running of the Race of Belgium, which ran at the Spa-Francorchamps circuit in 2005 before leaving the calendar for four seasons until returning in the 2010 season at Zolder.

The races were won by Robert Huff of Chevrolet RML and Gabriele Tarquini of Lukoil-SUNRED.

Background
After the Race of Brazil, Huff was leading the drivers' championship by four points over Chevrolet teammate Alain Menu. Kristian Poulsen was leading the Yokohama Independents' Trophy.

Chevrolet RML reverted to a three car operation having run guest driver Cacá Bueno in Brazil. bamboo–engineering switched to the Chevrolet Cruze 1.6T, replacing the Chevrolet Lacettis they ran in the opening round. Wiechers-Sport returned to the series with their new driver Urs Sonderegger in a BMW 320 TC. Norbert Michelisz and the Zengő-Dension Team returned with a turbocharged BMW having missed the opening round to test the new car.

Report

Testing and free practice
The test session on Friday saw Tarquini go fastest, leading Menu and championship leader Huff.

Huff was quickest in the free practice session on Saturday morning with Yvan Muller second making it a Chevrolet 1–2.

Muller led Huff and Menu in the final free practice session with Michel Nykjær the fastest SEAT driver in fourth. Fabio Fabiani missed the breaking point for turn one during the session, he ended up rolling backwards into the car but continued.

Qualifying
Chevrolet stayed on top in qualifying with Huff taking his second pole position of the year. Tiago Monteiro had been quickest in Q1 but Brazil podium finisher Tom Coronel failed to get through to the second session and lined up eleventh. Having been fourth in the afternoon practice session, Nykjær ended up 20th having not set a time. He had clipped one of the barriers at the chicane and was unable to continue in the session due to damage. Javier Villa didn't take part in qualifying due to engine issues.

In Q2, Huff set the fastest time to secure pole position and a late lap from Menu made it an all–Chevrolet front row. Tarquini finished third and Muller fourth, having run wide on his final flying lap. Monteiro was fifth and Poulsen in sixth was the leading independent driver. Michelisz was seventh in his first competitive session with the BMW.

Warm-Up
Proteam Racing's Villa topped the Sunday morning warm–up session with pole sitter Huff third.

Race One
The first race saw many drivers crash out and end their races prematurely. At the beginning Huff had a great get away from pole whilst Tarquini attempted to pass Menu put failed. Coronel had got a great get way but spun on the third lap and was hit by Franz Engstler. The damage was so much that Coronel wouldn't start race two. Meanwhile, further down the order, Aleksei Dudukalo and Yukinori Taniguchi were racing hard until Dudukalo put the Chevrolet into a small spin where Marchy Lee collected Taniguchi. Taniguchi managed to continue on in the race but Lee had to make a retirement. On lap eleven Poulsen and Michelisz were having a door to door battle, while Muller slipped past Tarquini for third. On the final lap Villa (who had started at the back of the grid) passed Darryl O'Young for ninth whilst Huff upfront took his second victory of the season.

Race Two
In race two there were new complications with the grid as Fredy Barth who was set for pole position had too much damage to compete along with others. This meant a reshuffle of the grid putting Tarquini on pole. Tarquini kept the three Chevrolets behind him at bay for thirteen laps despite a battle with Huff on lap five where the two made contact that would send Huff down to sixth by the end of the race due to the damage from the collision. O'Young was working his way up the order from ninth and finished the race fourth after Muller started to suffer problems and retired. This left Menu to fight for the win with Tarquini but was not good enough and behind them Monteiro completed the podium positions.

Results

Qualifying

Race 1

Bold denotes Fastest lap.

Race 2

Bold denotes Fastest lap.

Standings after the event

Drivers' Championship standings

Yokohama Independents' Trophy standings

Manufacturers' Championship standings

 Note: Only the top five positions are included for both sets of drivers' standings.

References

Results Booklet PDF at MST Systems

External links
World Touring Car Championship official website

Belgium
FIA WTCC Race of Belgium
Circuit Zolder
FIA WTCC Race of Belgium